Azrine Effendy Sa'duddin (born 7 May 1981) is a Malaysian footballer. He currently plays as a striker for Negeri Sembilan-based club Betaria FC.

He formerly played with Selangor FA. He also has played with Johor FA for the 2009 season before moving to Selangor. The other teams that Azrine have played prior to Johor are Kuala Lumpur FA and Negeri Sembilan FA. He played with Sime Darby FC for the 2011 season.

He was a member of Negeri Sembilan's Sukma Games 2006 winning team.

See also
Football in Malaysia
List of football clubs in Malaysia

References

External links
 

Living people
Malaysian footballers
Selangor FA players
Kuala Lumpur City F.C. players
Negeri Sembilan FA players
1981 births
Malaysian people of Malay descent
Association football forwards